"Play God" is the debut single by English singer and songwriter, Sam Fender. It was released on 30 March 2017 while a music video was released accompanying the video on 23 January 2019. The song was used in the trailer for the 2021 Netflix superhero series Jupiter's Legacy.

Music video
When describing the music video, Fender told NME that "Play God" is "set in an alternate dystopian reality that shares similarities with our own world." Vincent Haycock, who directed the music video described the video as a "satirical interpretation of power".

Critical reception
Harvey James, writing for The Last Magazine praised the song and Fender's singing saying that he has"total mastery over his voice was immediately and strikingly apparent." Clash called the song and the music video "provocative". Maxamillion Polo, writing for Ones to Watch praised the relevancy of the track in regards to modern neoliberalism. Polo wrote that "the track, which is equal parts Orwellian and a reaction to the landmark political decisions in both the UK and the US, is classic Brit-rock at its finest." Polo further complimented the instrumentation of "Play God" saying it is "driven by lush guitar melodies and Fender’s swirling mixture of questioning and positing, “Play God” draws the listener into his world defined by an increasingly uncertain future."

Charts

Certifications

References

External links
 

2017 singles
2017 songs
2019 singles
Sam Fender songs
Polydor Records singles
Universal Music Group singles